Vladaya Saddle (Vladayska Sedlovina \vla-'day-ska se-dlo-vi-'na\) is a saddle of elevation 1000 m in the Friesland Ridge of Tangra Mountains, Livingston Island in the South Shetland Islands, Antarctica.  Bounded by St. Cyril Peak to the northeast, and by St. Methodius Peak to the southwest.  Overlooking Ruen Icefall to the northwest, and Prespa Glacier to the southeast.  The feature is named after the settlement of Vladaya in western Bulgaria.

Location

Maps
 L.L. Ivanov et al. Antarctica: Livingston Island and Greenwich Island, South Shetland Islands. Scale 1:100000 topographic map. Sofia: Antarctic Place-names Commission of Bulgaria, 2005.
 L.L. Ivanov. Antarctica: Livingston Island and Greenwich, Robert, Snow and Smith Islands. Scale 1:120000 topographic map.  Troyan: Manfred Wörner Foundation, 2009.

References
 Vladaya Saddle. SCAR Composite Gazetteer of Antarctica
 Bulgarian Antarctic Gazetteer. Antarctic Place-names Commission. (details in Bulgarian, basic data in English)

External links
 Vladaya Saddle. Copernix satellite image

Mountain passes of Livingston Island
Bulgaria and the Antarctic